José María Bustillo was a military and politician and a President of Honduras 20–27 August 1839.

Year of birth missing
1855 deaths
Presidents of Honduras
19th-century Honduran people